The 2014–15 Scottish Challenge Cup, known as the Petrofac Training Cup due to sponsorship reasons with Petrofac, was the 24th season of the competition. It was competed for by 32 clubs, which included the 30 members of the 2014–15 Scottish Championship-League Two, the top Highland League club with a valid SFA club licence (Brora Rangers) and the highest placed team from the previous season in the Lowland League with a valid SFA club licence (Spartans).

The defending champions were Raith Rovers, who had defeated Rangers in the 2014 final. Raith were eliminated by Dunfermline Athletic in the first round of the North Section.

Schedule

Fixtures and results

First round

The first round draw took place on Wednesday 2 July 2014 at 2pm BST at Easter Road.

North Section

Source:

South Section

Source:

Second round
The second round draw took place on Tuesday 29 July 2014 at 3:30pm BST at the Petrofac Training base in Aberdeen.

North Section

Source:

South Section

Source:

Quarter-finals
The quarter-final draw took place on Thursday 21 August 2014 at 2pm BST at Lesser Hampden in Glasgow.

Source:

Semi-finals
The semi-final draw took place on Tuesday 9 September 2014 at 2pm BST at Hampden Park in Glasgow.

Source:

Final

Source:

References

External links
Petrofac Training Cup at the Scottish Professional Football League

Scottish Challenge Cup seasons
Challenge Cup
3